A Point Too Far to Astronaut is the debut studio album by American hip hop producer Telephone Jim Jesus. It was released on Anticon in 2004. It peaked at number 150 on the CMJ Radio 200 chart.

Critical reception

Sarah Zachrich of Splendid Magazine gave the album a favorable review, saying, "Telephone Jim Jesus will appeal to fans of both instrumental hip hop and more ambient fare; A Point Too Far to Astronauts music is fairly unstructured, but never floats too far into the stratosphere." Chadwicked of Tiny Mix Tapes called it "a passive-aggressive album that makes a great impact with subtle nuances."

Cokemachineglow placed it at number 47 on the "Top 50 Albums 2004" list.

Track listing

Personnel
Credits adapted from liner notes.

 Telephone Jim Jesus – production, mixing, illustration
 Pedestrian – vocals (4, 6, 10, 11, 16)
 Passage – vocals (13)
 Odd Nosdam – additional mixing (1, 4, 5, 7, 16), art direction
 Jeremy Goody – mastering

References

External links
 

2004 debut albums
Telephone Jim Jesus albums
Anticon albums